Lukáš Rosol was the defending champion but lost to Lukáš Lacko in the final.

Seeds

Draw

Finals

Top half

Bottom half

References
 Main Draw
 Qualifying Draw

Slovak Open - Singles
2013 Singles